Radosław Tomasz "Radek" Sikorski (born 23 February 1963) is a Polish politician and journalist who is a Member of the European Parliament. He was Marshal of the Sejm from 2014 to 2015 and Minister of Foreign Affairs in Donald Tusk's cabinet between 2007 and 2014. He previously served as Deputy Minister of National Defense (1992) in Jan Olszewski's cabinet, Deputy Minister of Foreign Affairs (1998–2001) in Jerzy Buzek's cabinet and Minister of National Defense (2005–2007) in the cabinets of Kazimierz Marcinkiewicz and Jarosław Kaczyński.

A graduate of Pembroke College, Oxford, between 1986 and 1989 he worked as a journalist for The Observer and The Spectator and in 1986 was a war correspondent in Afghanistan. In 1989, he reported on the conflict in Angola. Between 2003 and 2005, he was a member of the conservative think tank American Enterprise Institute. In 2012, he was included on the list of Top 100 Global Thinkers 2012 published by Foreign Policy magazine. In 2015, he became a Senior Fellow at the Center for European Studies of Harvard University. He is a Senior Network Member at the European Leadership Network (ELN).

Early life and education
Sikorski was born in Bydgoszcz. He chaired the local student strike committee in March 1981 while studying at the I Liceum Ogólnokształcące (High School). In June 1981 he travelled to the United Kingdom to study English. After martial law was declared in December 1981, he was granted political asylum in Britain in 1982. He studied Philosophy, Politics and Economics at Pembroke College, University of Oxford.

During his time at Oxford, Sikorski was head of the Standing Committee of the debating society, the Oxford Union (where he organised debates on martial law), president of the Oxford University Polish Society, member of the Canning Club, and was elected to the Bullingdon Club, a dining society that counted among its members former British Prime Minister, David Cameron, former Chancellor George Osborne, and former Prime Minister Boris Johnson. His articles were published in prestigious Polish émigré magazines as well as Britain's Sunday Telegraph and Tatler magazines. He graduated in 1986. In 1987, Sikorski acquired British citizenship, which he renounced in 2006 upon being named Minister of Defense of Poland.

Career

Journalism (1985–1992)
In the mid-1980s, Sikorski worked as a freelance journalist for publications such as The Spectator and The Observer. He also wrote for the Indian newspaper The Statesman of Kolkata. In 1986, he travelled in Afghanistan, as he stated in his book, "to write about the war the mujahideen were waging against the Soviet Union". While a war correspondent for The Sunday Telegraph, he brought out the first report and photographs of the US Stinger missiles, whose use was a turning point in the war.

In 1987, he made a hundred-day journey, under Soviet bombardment, to the ancient city of Herat. He won the 1st prize singles in category the category Spot News of World Press Photo Awards in 1988 for a photograph of a family killed and mummified in their home as a result of communist bombing raid.

His adventures were presented in the documentary "Polish Mujahideen: Radosław Sikorski", produced by Discovery Channel. Sikorski described his perilous journey to Herat in his first book Dust of the Saints: A Journey to Herat in Time of War.

In 1989, he became the chief foreign correspondent for the U.S. conservative magazine National Review, reporting from Afghanistan and Angola. He received praise for his article published in January 1989, "The coming crack-up of Communism", which proved prophetic. His article describing an ambush on the Benguela Highway conducted by Jonas Savimbi's UNITA rebels attracted widespread interest.

In 1990–91, he was the Warsaw correspondent for The Sunday Telegraph. He was the author of the Interview of the Month program on the public Polish TV, in which he interviewed Margaret Thatcher, Lech Walesa, Vaclav Klaus, Otto von Habsburg, Henry Kissinger, Qian Qichen and others.

Deputy Minister in Olszewski and Buzek governments (1992–2002)
Sikorski returned to Poland in August 1989. He briefly served as deputy defence minister in the Jan Olszewski government in 1992, in which he helped launch the Polish bid to join NATO. From 1998 to 2001, Sikorski served as undersecretary of state at the ministry of foreign affairs in the Jerzy Buzek's government, being deputy first to Bronisław Geremek, and then to Władysław Bartoszewski. He oversaw the consular service and initiated reforms of services for Poles abroad. He signed agreements to abolish visas with countries in Asia, Africa and Latin America, Singapore and Israel among them. He was Honorary Chairman of the Foundation for Assistance to Poles in the East.

During his time as a Deputy Foreign Minister, Sikorski focused on reforms inside the Ministry and started the campaign to protest the use of the misleading term "Polish concentration camps" in western media. He introduced the "cheap visa" program for Poland's Eastern neighbors and started the recovery of post-Soviet properties in Warsaw. He introduced competitions for posts of heads of Polish Institutes abroad. When Ted Turner made a demeaning joke about Poles in a Washington speech, Sikorski demanded an apology and Turner complied. Sikorski's appeal to Polish nationals with dual citizenship to use the passport of the country they were visiting caused some controversy among the Polish expatriate community, but has now become an established practice.

Policy analyst in the US (2002–2005)
From 2002 to 2005, Sikorski was a resident fellow of the American Enterprise Institute in Washington, D.C., and executive director of the New Atlantic Initiative. He was editor of the analytical publication European Outlook. He organised international conferences, including the "Ronald Reagan – Legacy for Europe" in 2003, during which prominent politicians from Eastern Europe discussed the impact the U.S. president left on the world. Other major conferences included: "25th Anniversary of the birth of Solidarity", "Axis of Evil: Belarus – The Missing Link" and "Ukraine's Choice" at the time of the Orange Revolution.

Minister of National Defence (2005–2007)

In 2005, Sikorski returned to Poland and was elected senator from his home town of Bydgoszcz with 76,370 votes. He joined Prime Minister Marcinkiewicz's government as Minister of National Defence on 31 October. During his time in MoD, he moved Warsaw Pact-era files to the Institute of National Remembrance, declassified Warsaw Pact maps which demonstrated Soviet plans to use nuclear weapons in an offensive war against NATO and cancelled the military pension of Helena Wolińska-Brus, a Stalin-era prosecutor who sentenced the anti-communist Polish resistance general August Emil "Nil" Fieldorf to death. He introduced electronic auctions in procurement for defense equipment, saving the ministry a great amount of money. He announced the tender to buy a fleet of new jets for government transportation. He declassified a file of an operation codenamed "Szpak" (starling) by the Military Information Services (Wojskowe Służby Informacyjne, WSI) which documented their operations against him containing transcripts of the bugging of his home and telephone as well as hostile articles in the media inspired by WSI operatives.

He resigned on 5 February 2007, on the eve of Poland's engagement in the war in Afghanistan in protest against the activities of the chief of military intelligence, Antoni Macierewicz. Though never a member of the Law and Justice party, he served out the parliamentary term in the Law and Justice Senatorial Club. In the early parliamentary elections of 2007, he was elected to the Lower House (Sejm) with 117,291 votes, one of 10 best results in the country.

Minister of Foreign Affairs (2007–2014)

He was sworn in as Minister of Foreign Affairs in Donald Tusk's government on 16 November 2007, succeeding Anna Fotyga. He joined Donald Tusk's liberal-conservative Civic Platform party and became a member of the Civic Platform national board in 2008.

Sikorski's policies are best understood in his annual statement to the Sejm (Parliament). Each one was followed by a day-long debate. As Minister of Foreign Affairs, Sikorski normalized relations with Russia, and helped to terminate the Russian embargo on Polish agricultural products. In 2009, Sikorski said that Russia is needed to solve the problems of European and global theatre. Therefore, if Russia could fulfil the conditions, it could apply to join NATO. He restated NATO criteria that Russia would have to meet are: be a democratic state, have civilian control over the army, and to settle any territorial disputes with its neighbours. At the same time, he enhanced relations with Germany and France. Cooperation in the Weimar Triangle –Poland, Germany, France – was particularly intense during his term of office. Weimar Triangle meetings included consultations with third parties, such as Ukraine, Moldova and Russia.

As foreign minister, he turned the ministry into a global institution with 4500 employees and 100 foreign branches. Over seven years his ministry carried out various reforms, introducing the Diplomatic Security Service, global digital secure communications, ISO standards in procedures, electronic document management, a blackberry and laptop for every diplomat, a satellite phone for every posting, new visual standards book; The Foreign Service Day, a dress code, the Bene Merito honorary badge, The Polish Institute of Diplomacy, Poland's Lech Wałęsa Solidarity Prize (worth 1 mln EUR); reduced the number of chancelleries in the MFA HQ from over 30 to 2, reformed the telegram and courier systems, reduced employment while raising salaries; quadrupled ambassadors and consuls operational funds, closed down 30 embassies and consulates and opened several new ones; he opened a Polish consulate in Sevastopol, the only one representing a Western country in that city for 4 years; built a new EU embassy in Brussels, a new Embassy residence in Washington, DC, a new Consulate-General in London; he moved consulates in Cologne, Manchester and Madrid; he created the MFA committee on cyber defence; the European Endowment for Democracy (EED), authorized intelligence operations. During Sikorski's term in office he was a regular visitor in Moscow and his Russian counterpart Foreign Minister, Sergei Lavrov visited Warsaw regularly. Sikorski made his first visit in Moscow in 2008 with Donald Tusk. In 2009 he visited Moscow to enhance Polish-Russian cooperation. During one of Lavrov's visits, he engaged in Q&A session with Polish diplomats during MFA annual global ambassadors conference.

In 2008, Sikorski concluded a long negotiation with the U.S. over the siting of a missile defense base in Poland. He insisted on Polish jurisdiction over base personnel and asked the U.S. to enhance Poland's air defences as part of the deal. The agreement was finally signed with the U.S. Secretary of State, Condoleezza Rice, over the objections of Russia. The agreement came less than two weeks after the outbreak of the 2008 Russo-Georgian South Ossetian war. On 17 September 2009, the Obama administration changed the plans for the base. The annex to the agreement, which envisages shorter-range missiles capable of defending Poland's territory was signed in the presence of Sikorski and Secretary of State, Hillary Clinton on 3 June 2010 in Kraków.

In March 2010, Sikorski took part in the Civic Platform Presidential primaries against the then Sejm Speaker, Bronisław Komorowski, who went on to defeat the late Lech Kaczyński's brother Jarosław and becoming president. At that time, Sikorski enjoyed some of the highest approval and trust ratings among Polish politicians.

At the height of the European sovereign debt crisis in November 2011, Sikorski delivered a speech in Berlin: "Poland and the future of the European Union" in front of the German Council on Foreign Relations, the prestigious non-profit organization composed of the German foreign policy elite. He warned that EU member states faced a choice "between deeper economic integration or collapse of the Eurozone". Sikorski made an extraordinary appeal: "I will probably be the first Polish foreign minister in history to say so, but here it is: I fear German power less than I am beginning to fear German inactivity". Sikorski labelled Germany Europe's "indispensable nation" and appealed to Germany to lead in saving the euro, offering Poland's support. According to many political commentators and journalists, this speech made a tremendous impact on German and European politics, not least because it changed the perception of Poland: from a problematic and needy recipient of Western support to a full-fledged member of the European Union.

Sikorski was involved in the events of the winter 2014 Ukraine Euromaidan protests at the international level. He signed on 21 February along with Ukrainian President Viktor Yanukovich and opposition leaders Vitaly Klitchko, Arseniy Yatsenyuk, and Oleg Tyagnibok as well as the Foreign Ministers of Russia, France and Germany a memorandum of understanding to promote peaceful changes in Ukrainian power.

Views on the Holocaust 
In a February 2011 interview with Israeli journalist Adar Primor, Sikorski declared, "Nazi Germany carried out the Holocaust on our soil - against our will, but in front of our eyes". He also said, "[L]ast time I checked the definition of the Holocaust, it was said to be a phenomenon in which a state uses industrial methods to eradicate an entire ethnic group. Horrendous events took place in Poland; there were periods during the Holocaust when people behaved heroically and others behaved like scum, but the Holocaust was the creation of the German state. We mustn't be confused about that".

Leaked conversations about geopolitics
In June 2014, a magazine in Poland published redacted transcripts of an illegally taped conversation between Sikorski and the former Polish finance minister Jacek Rostowski. The recordings were believed to have been made in the dining room of the Polish Business Council sometime between summer 2013 and spring 2014. Sikorski is heard criticizing the British Prime Minister David Cameron for his handling of the EU's fiscal pact to appease Eurosceptics in the Conservative Party.

In another part of the leaked conversation, Sikorski was reported to have said: The Polish-American alliance is worthless. It is even harmful because it creates a false sense of security for Poland. In the fragment of the record Sikorski said:We're going to antagonize Germany and Russia, and they will think that everything is ok because we have given a blowjob to the Americans. Losers. Total losers.Sikorski stated later that in the actual conversation, he was predicting what Polish foreign policy would look like under a Law and Justice government. Sikorski argued that the tapes, which did not contain any evidence of illegality, were part of an organized attack on the government:The Government was attacked by an organized criminal group. We are not sure who is behind it, but I hope its members will be identified and punished. The subject had favored NATO military bases in Poland and the Baltic states.

Ukraine 

As Poland's Minister of Foreign Affairs, Sikorski was a strong supporter of closer ties with the EU's Eastern Neighbors. He opted for the integration of those countries into European structures, advocated anchoring Ukraine within the European Union and called for economic changes in Belarus. Sikorski was the main architect, along with his Swedish counterpart and friend Carl Bildt, of the eastern policy of the EU – which came to be called the Eastern Partnership. Sikorski was also a supporter of the opening of EU borders to Ukraine and the Russian exclave of Kaliningrad by means of Local Border Traffic (LBT) agreements. Thanks to those agreements, citizens of neighbouring regions may travel visa-free in Poland. The agreement with Russia was signed by Sikorski and the Foreign Minister of Russia, Sergey Lavrov, on 14 December 2011. It entered into force in July 2012 and has been kept in place despite worsening of relations in other areas. 

On 19 February 2014, Sikorski was requested by the High Representative of the Union for Foreign Affairs and Security Policy (HRUFASP), Catherine Ashton, to begin a diplomatic mission in Kyiv. On 16 July, shortly after publicly accusing Russia of strengthening support for separatist rebels in Ukraine and a Ukrainian military transport plane shootdown, and shortly before an EU summit on whether to impose sanctions on Russia, Sikorski flew to Kyiv to meet with Ukraine's Foreign Minister, Pavlo Klimkin. Sikorski was the leading European politician during the Maidan crisis in February 2014, which was sparked by refusal of signing the EU-Ukraine Association Agreement by since-deposed Ukrainian president Viktor Yanukovich.

On 19 February 2014, Sikorski and HRUFASP Ashton launched a diplomatic mission in Kyiv. It resulted in the signing, on 21 February by Sikorski, Ukrainian President Viktor Yanukovich and opposition leaders Vitaly Klitchko, Arseniy Yatsenyuk, and Oleg Tyagnibok as well as the Foreign Ministers of France and Germany an agreement to constitutional rule and promote peaceful reforms in Ukraine. Following speeches by Sikorski and Frank-Walter Steinmeier the agreement was approved by the Maidan Rada with a vote of 35:2. The next day, Yanukovich fled Kyiv.

In May 2014 after the events of the Euromaidan, Sikorski labeled pro-Russian separatists as "terrorists". He also said: "Remember that on that Russian-Ukrainian border, people's identities are not as strong as we are used to in Europe. ... They reflect Ukraine's failure over the last 20 years and Ukraine's stagnant standards of living. You know, when you are a Ukrainian miner or soldier, and you earn half or a third of what your colleagues just across the border in Russia earn, that questions your identity."

On 16 July 2014, shortly after publicly accusing Russia of supporting for separatist rebels in Ukraine, and shortly before an EU summit on whether to impose sanctions on Russia, Sikorski flew to Kyiv to meet with Ukraine's Foreign Minister, Pavlo Klimkin, where he argued that sanctions should be imposed on Russia.

Campaign for EU HRUFASP 
On 1 August 2014, Sikorski was nominated for the post of HRUFASP. Sikorski had been a strong supporter of sanctions against Russia, in contrast to his top opponent for the position, Federica Mogherini.

On 3 August, Sikorski told CNN's Fareed Zakaria that the Malaysia Airlines Flight 17 crash had helped bring European leaders together against Russia. He noted the sanctions will cause economic "losses all around", especially for Poland, but declared that Europe cannot "stand idly by when Russia annexes, for the first time since the Second World War, a neighbour's province. And now supplying sophisticated weaponry to the separatists. "He called for more NATO troops in Poland and prepositioning of its equipment, as well as standing defence plans and bigger response forces. On 30 August, Polish Prime Minister Donald Tusk was appointed President of the European Council and Mogherini prevailed over Sikorski.

When later questioned, Sikorski called it "undoubtedly the prime minister's personal success but equally a success of Poland. We take this decision as both a signal of appreciation of the policies Poland has pursued over ten years of its EU membership and a sign that the distinctions between 'old' and 'new' member states are rapidly crumbling. On the 10th anniversary of Poland's accession to the EU, a Pole will lead the institution which sets the priorities of Europe." One such priority, according to Sikorski, is "a well-interconnected network of energy infrastructure and more efficient security of supply mechanisms." He backed Tusk's proposed pan-European "Energy Union" plan.

In September 2015, after leaving the Foreign Ministry, Sikorski again visited Kyiv, arguing that if Russia moves further into Ukraine, the West should provide Ukraine with defensive weapons.

Marshal of the Sejm (2014–2015)

On 24 September 2014, Sikorski was elected Marshal of the Sejm. As Marshal, Sikorski introduced a series of reforms: new standards for parliamentary travel, streamlined voting procedures and a new visual standard for parliamentary documents. He also authorized the construction of a new building for Parliamentary Committees.

On 10 June 2015 Sikorski announced his resignation from the post in the wake of an illegal wiretaps scandal. Despite being the victim of illegal action by others, Sikorski explained that he did not want to damage Civic Platform's chances of success in the forthcoming election – "I made this decision for the sake of the Civic Platform, the only party that can maintain Poland's high position in the world".

On 23 June 2015 Sikorski officially resigned. He decided not to run again for parliament.

Policy analyst in US (2015–2018)
On 6 November 2015 Sikorski was appointed a Senior Fellow at Harvard University's Center for European Studies. He is also a distinguished statesman with the Brzezinski Institute on Geostrategy at the Center for Strategic and International Studies.

On 11 February 2016, Sikorski was elected the chairman of the Board of the Bydgoszcz Industrial-Technological Park. He has donated his salary to Bydgoski Care and Education Institutions Unit (Bydgoski Zespół Placówek Opiekuńczo-Wychowawczych).

European Parliament (2019–present) 
In the 2019 European Parliament election Sikorski was elected as the MEP for the Kuyavian-Pomeranian constituency. He was elected as the new chair of the European Parliament's Delegation for relations with the United States of America (D-US).

2022 Russian invasion of Ukraine
On 15 May Sikorski took part in a televised debate in Toronto with John Mearsheimer over the 2022 Russian invasion of Ukraine. Sikorski identified Vladimir Putin as a culprit in conducting the invasion of Ukraine while Mearsheimer argued the position that Putin is pursuing a realist geopolitical plan to secure Russian national interests in the presence of perceived threats from an expanding NATO.

On 13 June Sikorski claimed that Russia appears to be in violation of the 1994 Budapest Memorandum, in which Ukraine gave up its nuclear weapons which it inherited from the Soviet Union and joined the Treaty on the Nonproliferation of Nuclear Weapons. In a televised interview, Sikorski argued that Russia broke the terms of the deal by invading Ukraine. This prompted the Chairman of the State Duma Vyacheslav Volodin to answer on his Telegram channel that "Sikorski is causing a nuclear conflict in the center of Europe. He does not think about the future of Ukraine or that of Poland. If his suggestions are fulfilled, these countries will cease to exist, as will Europe. Sikorski and the like are the reason why Ukraine must not only be liberated from Nazi ideology, but also demilitarized, ensuring the status of a country free of nuclear weapons."

On 27 September 2022, hours after the 2022 Nord Stream pipeline sabotage, Sikorski posted on Twitter "Thank you, USA" over a picture of the gas leaks that followed the explosions of the gas pipelines Nord Stream 1 and 2. Four hours later, after numerous media outlets had speculated that Sikorski implied the U.S. blew up the pipelines, he made subsequent tweets, where he called the explosions a "special maintenance operation", alluding to the Russian government's euphemism for the war in Ukraine. Two days later, on 29 September, he deleted his "Thank you, USA" tweet, keeping only his follow up tweets. By 30 September he had deleted his two subsequent tweets as well.

In January 2023, Sikorski, speaking to Radio ZET, alleged that Morawiecki's Cabinet had considered partitioning Ukraine in early days following Russian invasion, when the risk of fall of Ukraine was high. Propagandist claims of similar extent have previously been made Kremlin representatives as well as Alexander Lukashenko. Said allegations were denied by the Government, pointing to high levels of military support provided to Ukraine.

Other activities 

Other activities include: 
 Bilderberg Group, Member of the Steering Committee

Books published
Moscow's Afghan war. Soviet motives and western interests, 1987

Dust of the Saints, 1989 (the Polish translation, Prochy Świętych, was first published in 1990)

The Polish House: An Intimate History of Poland, 1998 (the American edition is titled Full Circle: A Homecoming to Free Poland)

Strefa Zdekomunizowana [Communism-freed Zone], 2007

Polska może być lepsza [Poland could be better], 2018

Honors, awards and international recognition

Sikorski received the following honors and awards:

Domestic orders and decorations
 Honorary badge Meritorious Activist of Culture
 Decoration of Honour 'Husarz Polski' (No. 33), 2006
 Decoration of Honor Meritorious for Polish Culture

Foreign orders and decorations
Grand Cross of the Order of Merit of the Federal Republic of Germany, Germany, 2016
 Member 1st Class of the Order of Merit (No. 407), Ukraine, 2007
 Grand Officer of the Legion of Honour, France, 2012
 Lithuanian Millennium Star, Lithuania, 2008
 Honorary Companion with Breast Star of the National Order of Merit, Malta, 2009
 Commander Grand Cross of the Order of the Polar Star, Sweden, 2011
 Member 3rd class of the Order of Prince Yaroslav the Wise, Ukraine, 2011
Commander of the Order of Saint-Charles, Monaco, 2012
Grand Officer of the Order of the Three Stars, Latvia, 2013
 Presidential Order of Excellence, Georgia, 2013
 Grand Officer of the Order of the Crown, Belgium, 2013
 Commander's Cross with Star of the Order of Merit, Hungary, 2014
Grand Commander of the Order of Honour, Greece, 2014
 Recipient of the Order of Honour, Moldova, 2014
Member 1st Class of the Order of the Cross of Terra Mariana, Estonia, 2014

Awards
 Knight of Freedom Award, 2015
 Gold Badge of the Association of Poles in Lithuania, 2010
 Listed among the "Top 100 Global Thinkers 2012" by the magazine Foreign Policy for "speaking the truth, even when it is not diplomatic."
 The Spectator and The Sunday Telegraph 'Young Writers' Award
  for "Most Popular Politician", 2006
 Laurel of Skills and Competencies 2009 awarded by the Regional Chamber of Commerce in Katowice, 2009
 Freedom Award, the Atlantic Council

Honorary doctorates
 Honorary Doctorate, Nova University, Lisbon, 2015

Personal life
Since 1992 Sikorski has been married to American journalist and historian Anne Applebaum. They have two children, Aleksander (born 1997) and Tadeusz (born 2000).

See also
History of Poland (1989–present)
List of political parties in Poland
List of politicians in Poland
Politics of Poland
2005 Polish presidential election
2005 Polish parliamentary election
2007 Polish parliamentary election
2011 Polish parliamentary election
2015 Polish parliamentary election

References

External links

 
 Interview with Radosław Sikorski in PLUS Journal
 Interview with Radosław Sikorski in Fletcher Forum of World Affairs
 NATO's Past, Present and Future  Speech before the Chicago Council on Global Affairs 
 The Future of EU-Russia Relations, The New York Times
 Why the west needs a New Start, The Guardian
 Hard Talk Interview with Radosław Sikorski, YouTube
 Radosław Sikorski on Morning Joe MSNBC, YouTube
 Davos Annual Meeting 2010 – Rebuilding Peace and Stability in Afghanistan, YouTube
 BBC Radio 4 Profile

|-

|-

|-

1963 births
Alumni of Pembroke College, Oxford
American Enterprise Institute
Commanders Grand Cross of the Order of the Polar Star
Living people
Members of the Senate of Poland 2005–2007
Marshals of the Sejm of the Third Polish Republic
Ministers of National Defence of Poland
Movement for Reconstruction of Poland politicians
People from Bydgoszcz
Polish anti-communists
Polish expatriates in the United Kingdom
Polish expatriates in the United States
Polish Roman Catholics
Recipients of the National Order of Merit (Malta)
Recipients of the Order of Merit (Ukraine), 1st class
Recipients of the Order of Prince Yaroslav the Wise, 3rd class
Recipients of the Order of Merit of the Federal Republic of Germany
Solidarity (Polish trade union) activists
Recipients of the Order of Honour (Moldova)
Members of the Polish Sejm 2007–2011
Members of the Polish Sejm 2011–2015
MEPs for Poland 2019–2024
Bullingdon Club members
Recipient of the Meritorious Activist of Culture badge